This list of Oxford architects includes architects and architectural practices that have designed buildings in the university city of Oxford, England.

A
 Ahrends, Burton and Koralek
 ADAM Architecture
 Adrian James Architects
 Henry Aldrich
 William Arnold

B
 Herbert Baker
 Charles Bell
 John Billing
 Arthur Blomfield
 Reginald Blomfield
 George Frederick Bodley
 Edward George Bruton
 Charles Buckeridge
 Herbert Tudor Buckland
 John Chessell Buckler
 William Burges
 William Butterfield

C
 Walter Cave
 Basil Champneys
 George Clarke
 Charles Robert Cockerell
 Frederick Codd
 Ninian Comper
 Lewis Nockalls Cottingham

D
 T. Lawrence Dale
 Thomas Newenham Deane
 Edwin Dolby
 Philip Dowson
 Harry Drinkwater

E
 Raymond Erith

F
 T. P. Figgis
 Edmund Fisher
 Norman Foster

G
 Thomas Garner
 James Gibbs
 John Gibbs
 Gillespie, Kidd & Coia
 John Gwynn

H
 Joseph Hansom
 Henry Hare
 Daniel Harris
 Austen Harrison
 Nicholas Hawksmoor
 John Hayward
 William Haywood
 Thomas Holt
 Geddes Hyslop

J
 Thomas Graham Jackson
 Arne Jacobsen
 Robert Janyns
 Edward Jones CBE with Jeremy Dixon

K
 Henry Keene

L
 Henry Vaughan Lanchester
 Thomas Arthur Lodge
 Edwin Lutyens

M
 Richard MacCormac
 Leslie Martin
 Rick Mather
 Edward Maufe
 Walter Edward Mills
 MJP Architects
 Harry Wilkinson Moore
 Temple Moore
 Alfred Mardon Mowbray
 Percy Richard Morley Horder
 Hidalgo Moya

O
 William Orchard

P
 John Loughborough Pearson
 John Plowman
 Demetri Porphyrios
 Philip Powell
 Augustus Pugin

R
 Albert Richardson
 Daniel Robertson
 Clapton Crabb Rolfe

S
 Stephen Salter
 Samuel Lipscomb Seckham
 George Gilbert Scott
 George Gilbert Scott Jr.
 Giles Gilbert Scott
 John Simpson
 Alison and Peter Smithson
 Sow Space
 J. J. Stevenson
 James Stirling
 Nicholas Stone
 George Edmund Street

T
 Samuel Sanders Teulon

U
 Henry Jones Underwood

W
 Edward Prioleau Warren
 Alfred Waterhouse
 Paul Waterhouse
 Edward Doran Webb
 WilkinsonEyre
 William Wilkinson
 Colin St John Wilson
 Benjamin Woodward
 Hubert Worthington
 Thomas Worthington
 Christopher Wren
 James Wyatt
 William Wynford

See also 
 List of British architects

References 

 
Architects
Lists of architects
Lists of English people
Architects